Rachel Corbett (born 1984) is an American author and journalist. She is the author of the book You Must Change Your Life: The Story of Rainer Maria Rilke and Auguste Rodin, published by W.W. Norton in 2016. She was the executive editor of Modern Painters from 2016-2017. Prior to that she worked as a correspondent for The Art Newspaper.

Life
Corbett studied at Columbia Graduate School of Journalism and the University of Iowa. Her 2016 book, You Must Change Your Life: The Story of Rainer Maria Rilke and Auguste Rodin, won the Marfield Prize.

Selected works

Books

Essays and reporting

Corbett, Rachel (October 18, 2018). "The Culture Wars of Car Racing." The New York Times Magazine.
Corbett, Rachel (October, 2019). "Medicaid's Dark Secret: For many participants, the program that provides health care to millions of low-income Americans isn’t free. It’s a loan. And the government expects to be repaid." The Atlantic.

References

External links

 

1984 births
Living people
American art historians
American magazine editors
American women journalists
Columbia University Graduate School of Journalism alumni
The New Yorker people
University of Iowa alumni
Women magazine editors
Women art historians
American women historians
21st-century American women